Hatchet Lake may refer to:

Canada
 Hatchet Lake, Nova Scotia (disambiguation), several lakes and a community in Nova Scotia
 Hatchet Lake (Saskatchewan), a lake in Saskatchewan
 Hatchet Lake Airport, an airport in Saskatchewan near the kake
 Hatchet Lake Water Aerodrome, an Aerodrome on the lake
 Hatchet Lake Denesuline First Nation, a Dene First Nation in northern Saskatchewan

United States
 Hatchet Lake (Idaho), a lake in Custer County